Boris Živanović (born 18 July 1989) is a Serbian footballer who most recently played for Szeged 2011. He has Serbian and Hungarian passport.

Club statistics

Updated to games played as of 11 November 2014.

References
HLSZ

External links

1989 births
Living people
Footballers from Belgrade
Serbian footballers
Association football midfielders
FK Zemun players
FK Rad players
FK Mačva Šabac players
FK Radnički 1923 players
Budapest Honvéd FC players
Nyíregyháza Spartacus FC players
Nemzeti Bajnokság I players
Pittsburgh Riverhounds SC players
FC Koper players
FC Dunărea Călărași players
FK Borac Čačak players
Serbian expatriate footballers
Expatriate footballers in Hungary
Expatriate soccer players in the United States
Serbian expatriate sportspeople in Hungary
USL Championship players
Slovenian PrvaLiga players
Liga II players
Expatriate footballers in Slovenia
Serbian expatriate sportspeople in Slovenia
Expatriate footballers in Romania
Serbian expatriate sportspeople in Romania